Otar Khizaneishvili (born 26 September 1981) is a Georgian former professional footballer who played as a centre-back for the Georgian national team.

Early life
Khizaneishvili was born on 26 September 1981 in Tbilisi, the capital city of the Republic of Georgia to a Russian father from Moscow and a Georgian mother.

Club career
Khizaneishvili came from the youth team of Dinamo Tbilisi, and debuted for the Georgia national team at the age of 18. He went to Russian giants Spartak Moscow, but failed to make a breakthrough and had various spells for other Russian clubs as well as Dinamo in the following seasons.

Fine performances for Georgia in the qualification for the 2006 FIFA World Cup attracted the interest of SC Freiburg, which is known for signing Georgian players. He scored his first goal for Freiburg in a 3–1 win against Rot-Weiss Essen on 28 January 2007.

In August 2015, Khizaneishvili announced his retirement from professional football.

International career
Khizaneishvili earned 20 caps for the national team.

References

External links
 
 

1981 births
Living people
Georgian people of Russian descent
Footballers from Tbilisi
Footballers from Georgia (country)
Association football defenders
Georgia (country) international footballers
Russian Premier League players
Bundesliga players
2. Bundesliga players
FC Dinamo Tbilisi players
FC Spartak Moscow players
FC Spartak-2 Moscow players
FC Rostov players
FC Dynamo Moscow players
SC Freiburg players
FC Augsburg players
FC Vostok players
FC Anzhi Makhachkala players
FC Dila Gori players
FC Zestafoni players
FC Sioni Bolnisi players
Expatriate footballers from Georgia (country)
Expatriate sportspeople from Georgia (country) in Germany
Expatriate footballers in Germany
Expatriate sportspeople from Georgia (country) in Russia
Expatriate footballers in Russia